Potosino is a demonym associated with San Luis Potosí City, San Luis Potosi, Mexico.  It may refer to:

 Atlético Potosino, a football team
 Autódromo Potosino, a racecourse
 Club Deportivo Potosino, a sports club
 FC Potosino, a football team
 Instituto Potosino de Investigación Científica y Tecnológica, the San Luis Potosí Institute of Scientific Research and Technology
 Instituto Potosino Marista, a K-12 Marist Brothers school